Muddula Priyudu ( Adorable Lover) is a 1994 Indian Telugu-language romantic action film, produced by K. Krishnamohana Rao under R.K. Film Associates and directed by K. Raghavendra Rao. It stars Venkatesh, Ramya Krishna and Rambha , with music composed by M. M. Keeravani. The film was a Hit at the box office. It was dubbed in Tamil as Sabash Ramu, in Hindi as Sajna Doli Leke Aana and in Malayalam as Ini Oru Pranayakadha.

Plot
Ramu leads a carefree life, living along with his widowed mother in a village. He was in love with Usha, daughter of Dharmaiah, village president. He is often involved in petty quarrels with Bujjulu, son of Kobbarikayala Subbaiah, who happens to be the brother-in-law of Dharmaiah. Subbaiah was a landlord and a moneylender who often torments villagers for money and domination. He wants to marry Usha to his son to ensure power over the entire village. But Ramu always comes in between and he decides to get rid of him by involving him in a thievery case. But Ramu manages to prove the truth and sends Subbaiah to jail.

Enraged, Subbaiah pledges revenge on Ramu. Meanwhile, Ramu and Usha's marriage settles with the consent of their families. Ramu leaves for town to bring things for the marriage, but gets attacked by Subbaiah's goons on the way. They beat him and throw him in a river believing that he is dead. Everybody including Usha thinks that he is dead and lose all hope.

But Ramu was alive and rescued by boatmen and nursed back to health. When he regains his consciousness, he forgets everything about the past and settles as Raju. Later he gets the job to tutor grandchildren of Major Narayana Murthy. Though those kids are naughty and mischievous, through patience and love Raju slowly gains their confidence. Sandhya, eldest of them and Raju fall in love and Narayana Murthy happily gives consent for their marriage. But fate takes him back to Subbaiah's goons and they again try to kill him. Raju gradually regains his memory, but forgets the time he spent with Sandhya. He goes back to his village and reconciles with Usha.

Sandhya desperately organizes the search for him and at last finds him in his village with the help of her servant and friend Gundu. She goes there and tries to get in contact with Ramu, who already forgot all about Sandhya. Misunderstandings ensue and finally Ramu remembers his past with Sandhya and becomes confused about what to do. Meanwhile, Major Narayana Murthy arrives in Village and says Dharmaiah about dark secret of Sandhya that she got married and her husband died on that day by Holy Fire and Sandhya goes to Shock after that incident and forgot about her Some part of past life. Subbaiah gets released from prison and directly comes to take revenge on Ramu. He kidnaps Usha and tries to forcefully marry her to his son Bujjulu. Ramu manages to defeat all those goons and save Usha. In the climax, Sandhya  accepts her fate and leaves for her home, leaving Usha and Ramu to marry and have a regular life.

Cast
Venkatesh as Ramu / Raju
Ramya Krishna as Sandhya
Rambha as Usha
Satyanarayana as Major Narayana Murthy
Kota Srinivasa Rao as Kobbarikayala Subbaiah
Gollapudi Maruti Rao as Dharmaiah
Annapoorna as Parvathamma, Ramu's mother
Brahmanandam as Gundu
Babu Mohan as Thannula Swamy
Ali as Bujjulu
Suthivelu as Gundu's Uncle
Ratnasagar as Gundu's Mother
Chidatala Apparao

Soundtrack

Music composed by M. M. Keeravani. Music released on SUPREME Music Company.

References

External links

1994 films
1990s Telugu-language films
Films directed by K. Raghavendra Rao
Films scored by M. M. Keeravani
Indian romantic comedy films
Indian romantic musical films
1994 romantic comedy films
1990s romantic musical films